The history of macOS, Apple's current Mac operating system formerly named Mac OS X until 2011 and then OS X until 2016, began with the company's project to replace its "classic" Mac OS. That system, up to and including its final release Mac OS 9, was a direct descendant of the operating system Apple had used in its Mac computers since their introduction in 1984. However, the current macOS is a Unix operating system built on technology that had been developed at NeXT from the 1980s until Apple purchased the company in early 1997.

Although it was originally marketed as simply "version 10" of the Mac OS (indicated by the Roman numeral "X"), it has a completely different codebase from Mac OS 9, as well as substantial changes to its user interface. The transition was a technologically and strategically significant one. To ease the transition for users and developers, versions through 10.4 were able to run Mac OS 9 and its applications in a compatibility layer.

macOS was first released in 1999 as Mac OS X Server 1.0. It was built using the technologies Apple acquired from NeXT, but didn’t include the signature Aqua user interface (UI). The desktop version aimed at regular users—Mac OS X 10.0—shipped in March 2001. Since then, several more distinct desktop and server editions of macOS have been released. Starting with Mac OS X 10.7 Lion, macOS Server is no longer offered as a standalone operating system; instead, server management tools are available for purchase as an add-on. The macOS Server app has been discontinued since April 2022 and will no longer work on macOS versions past macOS 12 Monterey. Starting with the Intel build of Mac OS X 10.5 Leopard, most releases have been certified as Unix systems conforming to the Single Unix Specification.

Lion was referred to by Apple as "Mac OS X Lion" and sometimes as "OS X Lion"; Mountain Lion was officially referred to as just "OS X Mountain Lion", with the "Mac" being completely dropped. The operating system was further renamed to "macOS" starting with macOS Sierra.

macOS retained the major version number 10 throughout its development history until the release of macOS 11 Big Sur in 2020; releases of macOS have also been named after big cats (versions 10.0–10.8) or locations in California (10.9–present).

The current major version, macOS 13 Ventura, was announced on June 6, 2022 at WWDC 2022 and released on October 25 of that year.

Development

Development outside Apple

After Apple removed Steve Jobs from management in 1985, he left the company and attempted to create the "next big thing", with funding from Ross Perot and himself. The result was the NeXT Computer. As the first workstation to include a digital signal processor (DSP) and a high-capacity optical disc drive, NeXT hardware was advanced for its time, but was expensive relative to the rapidly commoditizing workstation market. The hardware was phased out in 1993; however, the company's object-oriented operating system NeXTSTEP had a more lasting legacy.

NeXTSTEP was based on the Mach kernel developed at CMU (Carnegie Mellon University) and BSD, an implementation of Unix dating back to the 1970s. It featured an object-oriented programming framework based on the Objective-C language. This environment is known today in the Mac world as Cocoa. It also supported the innovative Enterprise Objects Framework database access layer and WebObjects application server development environment, among other notable features.

All but abandoning the idea of an operating system, NeXT managed to maintain a business selling WebObjects and consulting services, only ever making modest profits in its last few quarters as an independent company. NeXTSTEP underwent an evolution into OPENSTEP which separated the object layers from the operating system below, allowing it to run with less modification on other platforms. OPENSTEP was, for a short time, adopted by Sun and HP.

However, by this point, a number of other companies — notably Apple, IBM, Microsoft, and even Sun itself — were claiming they would soon be releasing similar object-oriented operating systems and development tools of their own. Some of these efforts, such as Taligent, did not fully come to fruition; others, like Java, gained widespread adoption.

On February 4, 1997, Apple Computer acquired NeXT for $427 million, and used OPENSTEP as the basis for Mac OS X, as it was called at the time. Traces of the NeXT software heritage can still be seen in macOS. For example, in the Cocoa development environment, the Objective-C library classes have "NS" prefixes, and the HISTORY section of the manual page for the defaults command in macOS straightforwardly states that the command "First appeared in NeXTStep."

Internal development

Meanwhile, Apple was facing commercial difficulties of its own. The decade-old Macintosh System Software had reached the limits of its single-user, co-operative multitasking architecture, and its once-innovative user interface was looking increasingly outdated. A massive development effort to replace it, known as Copland, was started in 1994, but was generally perceived outside Apple to be a hopeless case due to political infighting and conflicting goals. By 1996, Copland was nowhere near ready for release, and the project was eventually cancelled. Some elements of Copland were incorporated into Mac OS 8, released on July 26, 1997.

After considering the purchase of BeOS — a multimedia-enabled, multi-tasking OS designed for hardware similar to Apple's, the company decided instead to acquire NeXT and use OPENSTEP as the basis for their new OS. Avie Tevanian took over OS development, and Steve Jobs was brought on as a consultant. At first, the plan was to develop a new operating system based almost entirely on an updated version of OPENSTEP, with the addition of a virtual machine subsystem — known as the Blue Box — for running "classic" Macintosh applications. The result was known by the code name Rhapsody, slated for release in late 1998.

Apple expected that developers would port their software to the considerably more powerful OPENSTEP libraries once they learned of its power and flexibility. Instead, several major developers such as Adobe told Apple that this would never occur, and that they would rather leave the platform entirely. This "rejection" of Apple's plan was largely the result of a string of previous broken promises from Apple; after watching one "next OS" after another disappear and Apple's market share dwindle, developers were not interested in doing much work on the platform at all, let alone a re-write.

Changed direction under Jobs
Apple's financial losses continued and the board of directors lost confidence in CEO Gil Amelio, asking him to resign. The board asked Steve Jobs to lead the company on an interim basis, essentially giving him carte blanche to make changes to return the company to profitability. When Jobs announced at the World Wide Developer's Conference that what developers really wanted was a modern version of the Mac OS, and Apple was going to deliver it, he was met with applause.

Over the next two years, a major effort was applied to porting the original Macintosh APIs to Unix libraries known as Carbon. Mac OS applications could be ported to Carbon without the need for a complete re-write, making them operate as native applications on the new operating system. Meanwhile, applications written using the older toolkits would be supported using the "Classic" Mac OS 9 environment. Support for C, C++, Objective-C, Java, and Python were added, furthering developer comfort with the new platform.

During this time, the lower layers of the operating system (the Mach kernel and the BSD layers on top of it) were re-packaged and released under the Apple Public Source License. They became known as Darwin. The Darwin kernel provides a stable and flexible operating system, which takes advantage of the contributions of programmers and independent open-source projects outside Apple; however, it sees little use outside the Macintosh community.

During this period, the Java programming language had increased in popularity, and an effort was started to improve Mac Java support. This consisted of porting a high-speed Java virtual machine to the platform, and exposing macOS-specific "Cocoa" APIs to the Java language.

The first release of the new OS — Mac OS X Server 1.0 — used a modified version of the Mac OS GUI, but all client versions starting with Mac OS X Developer Preview 3 used a new theme known as Aqua. Aqua was a substantial departure from the Mac OS 9 interface, which had evolved with little change from that of the original Macintosh operating system: it incorporated full color scalable graphics, anti-aliasing of text and graphics, simulated shading and highlights, transparency and shadows, and animation. A new feature was the Dock, an application launcher which took advantage of these capabilities.

Despite this, Mac OS X maintained a substantial degree of consistency with the traditional Mac OS interface and Apple's own Apple Human Interface Guidelines, with its pull-down menu at the top of the screen, familiar keyboard shortcuts, and support for a single-button mouse. The development of Aqua was delayed somewhat by the switch from OpenStep's Display PostScript engine to one developed in-house that was free of any license restrictions, known as Quartz.

Releases

With the exception of Mac OS X Server 1.0 and the original public beta, the first several macOS versions were named after big cats. Prior to its release, version 10.0 was code named "Cheetah" internally at Apple, and version 10.1 was code named internally as "Puma". 

After the code name "Jaguar" for version 10.2 received publicity in the media, Apple began openly using the names to promote the operating system: 10.3 was marketed as "Panther", 10.4 as "Tiger", 10.5 as "Leopard", 10.6 as "Snow Leopard", 10.7 as "Lion", and 10.8 as "Mountain Lion". "Panther", "Tiger", and "Leopard" were registered as trademarks. 

Apple registered "Lynx" and "Cougar", but these were allowed to lapse. Apple started using the name of locations in California for subsequent releases: 10.9 Mavericks is named after Mavericks, a popular surfing destination; 10.10 Yosemite is named after Yosemite National Park; 10.11 El Capitan is named for the El Capitan rock formation in Yosemite National Park; 10.12 Sierra is named for the Sierra Nevada mountain range; and 10.13 High Sierra is named for the area around the High Sierra Camps.

Public Beta: "Kodiak"

On September 13, 2000, Apple released a $29.95 "preview" version of Mac OS X (internally codenamed Kodiak) in order to gain feedback from users. It marked the first public availability of the Aqua interface, and Apple made many changes to the UI based on customer feedback. Mac OS X Public Beta expired and ceased to function in spring 2001.

Version 10.0: "Cheetah"
On March 24, 2001, Apple released Mac OS X 10.0 (internally codenamed Cheetah).
The initial version was slow, incomplete, and had very few applications available at the time of its launch, mostly from independent developers. While many critics suggested that the operating system was not ready for mainstream adoption, they recognized the importance of its initial launch as a base on which to improve. Simply releasing Mac OS X was received by the Macintosh community as a great accomplishment, for attempts to completely overhaul the Mac OS had been underway since 1996, and delayed by countless setbacks. Following some bug fixes, kernel panics became much less frequent.

Version 10.1: "Puma"
Mac OS X 10.1 (internally codenamed Puma) was released on September 25, 2001.
It has better performance and provided missing features, such as DVD playback. Apple released 10.1 as a free upgrade CD for 10.0 users. Apple released a  upgrade CD for Mac OS 9.

On January 7, 2002, Apple announced that Mac OS X was to be the default operating system for all Macintosh products by the end of that month.

Version 10.2: "Jaguar"
On August 23, 2002,
Apple followed up with Mac OS X 10.2 Jaguar, the first release to use its code name as part of the branding.
It brought great raw performance improvements, a sleeker look, and many powerful user-interface enhancements (over 150, according to Apple
), including Quartz Extreme for compositing graphics directly on an ATI Radeon or Nvidia GeForce2 MX AGP-based video card with at least 16 MB of VRAM, a system-wide repository for contact information in the new Address Book, and an instant messaging client named iChat.
The Happy Mac which had appeared during the Mac OS startup sequence for almost 18 years was replaced with a large grey Apple logo with the introduction of Mac OS X 10.2.

Version 10.3: "Panther"
Mac OS X Panther was released on October 24, 2003. In addition to providing much improved performance, it also incorporated the most extensive update yet to the user interface. Panther included as many or more new features as Jaguar had the year before, including an updated Finder, incorporating a brushed-metal interface, Fast user switching, Exposé (Window manager), FileVault, Safari, iChat AV (which added videoconferencing features to iChat), improved Portable Document Format (PDF) rendering and much greater Microsoft Windows interoperability.
Support for some early G3 computers such as the Power Macintosh and PowerBook was discontinued.

Version 10.4: "Tiger"
Mac OS X Tiger was released on April 29, 2005. Apple stated that Tiger contained more than 200 new features.
As with Panther, certain older machines were no longer supported; Tiger requires a Mac with a built-in FireWire port.
Among the new features, Tiger introduced Spotlight, Dashboard, Smart Folders, updated Mail program with Smart Mailboxes, QuickTime 7, Safari 2, Automator, VoiceOver, Core Image and Core Video. The initial release of the Apple TV used a modified version of Tiger with a different graphical interface and fewer applications and services.

On January 10, 2006, Apple released the first Intel-based Macs along with the 10.4.4 update to Tiger. This operating system functioned identically on the PowerPC-based Macs and the new Intel-based machines, with the exception of the Intel release dropping support for the Classic environment.
Only PowerPC Macs can be booted from retail copies of the Tiger client DVD, but there is a Universal DVD of Tiger Server 10.4.7 (8K1079) that can boot both PowerPC and Intel Macs.

Version 10.5: "Leopard"
Mac OS X Leopard was released on October 26, 2007. Apple called it "the largest update of Mac OS X". Leopard supports both PowerPC- and Intel x86-based Macintosh computers; support for the G3 processor was dropped and the G4 processor required a minimum clock rate of 867 MHz, and at least 512 MB of RAM to be installed. The single DVD works for all supported Macs (including 64-bit machines). New features include a new look, an updated Finder, Time Machine, Spaces, Boot Camp pre-installed, full support for 64-bit applications (including graphical applications), new features in Mail and iChat, and a number of new security features. 

Leopard is an Open Brand UNIX 03 registered product on the Intel platform. It was also the first BSD-based OS to receive UNIX 03 certification. Leopard dropped support for the Classic Environment and all Classic applications, and was the final version of Mac OS X to support the PowerPC architecture.

Version 10.6: "Snow Leopard"
Mac OS X Snow Leopard was released on August 28, 2009, the last version to be available on disc. For most users, the most noticeable changes are these: the disk space that the operating system frees up after a clean installation compared to Mac OS X 10.5 Leopard, a more responsive Finder rewritten in Cocoa, faster Time Machine backups, more reliable and user friendly disk ejects, a more powerful version of the Preview application, as well as a faster Safari web browser.

An update introduced support for the Mac App Store, Apple's digital distribution platform for macOS applications and subsequent macOS upgrades. Snow Leopard only supports machines with Intel CPUs, requires at least 1 GB of RAM, and drops default support for applications built for the PowerPC architecture (Rosetta can be installed as an additional component to retain support for PowerPC-only applications).

Version 10.7: "Lion"
Mac OS X Lion (also known as OS X Lion) was released on July 20, 2011. It brought developments made in Apple's iOS, such as an easily navigable display of installed applications (Launchpad) and (a greater use of) multi-touch gestures, to the Mac. This release removed Rosetta, making it incapable of running PowerPC applications. It dropped support for 32-bit Intel processors and requires 2GB of memory. Changes made to the GUI (Graphical User Interface) include the Launchpad (similar to the home screen of iOS and iPadOS devices), auto-hiding scrollbars that only appear when they are being used, and Mission Control, which unifies Exposé, Spaces, Dashboard, and full-screen applications within a single interface.
Apple also made changes to applications: they resume in the same state as they were before they were closed (similar to iOS). Documents auto-save by default.

Version 10.8: "Mountain Lion"
OS X Mountain Lion was released on July 25, 2012. It incorporates some features seen in iOS 5, which include Game Center, support for iMessage in the new Messages messaging application, and Reminders as a to-do list app separate from iCal (which is renamed as Calendar, like the iOS app). It also includes support for storing iWork documents in iCloud. 2GB of memory is required. Notification Center, which makes its debut in Mountain Lion, is a desktop version similar to the one in iOS 5.0 and higher. Application pop-ups are now concentrated on the corner of the screen, and the Center itself is pulled from the right side of the screen. Mountain Lion also includes more Chinese features, including support for Baidu as an option for Safari search engine. Notification Center is added, providing an overview of alerts from applications. Notes is added, as an application separate from Mail, synching with its iOS counterpart through the iCloud service. Messages, an instant messaging software application, replaces iChat.

Version 10.9: "Mavericks"
OS X Mavericks was released on October 22, 2013, as a free update through the Mac App Store worldwide.
It placed emphasis on battery life, Finder enhancements, other enhancements for power users, and continued iCloud integration, as well as bringing more of Apple's iOS apps to the OS X platform. iBooks and Apple Maps applications were added. Mavericks requires 2GB of memory to operate. It is the first version named under Apple's then-new theme of places in California, dubbed Mavericks after the surfing location. Unlike previous versions of OS X, which had progressively decreasing prices since 10.6, 10.9 was available at no charge to all users of compatible systems running Snow Leopard (10.6) or later, beginning Apple's policy of free upgrades for life on its operating system and business software.

Version 10.10: "Yosemite"
OS X Yosemite was released to the general public on October 16, 2014, as a free update through the Mac App Store worldwide. It featured a major overhaul of user interface, replaced skeuomorphism with flat graphic design and blurred translucency effects, following the aesthetic introduced with iOS 7. It introduced features called Continuity and Handoff, which allow for tighter integration between paired OS X and iOS devices: the user can handle phone calls or text messages on either their Mac or their iPhone, and edit the same Pages document on either their Mac or their iPad. A later update of the OS included Photos as a replacement for iPhoto and Aperture.

Version 10.11: "El Capitan"
OS X El Capitan was revealed on June 8, 2015, during the WWDC15 keynote speech. It was made available as a public beta in July and was made available publicly on September 30, 2015. Apple described this release as containing "Refinements to the Mac Experience" and "Improvements to System Performance" rather than new features. Refinements include public transport built into the Maps application, GUI improvements to the Notes application, as well as adopting San Francisco as the system font. Metal API, an application enhancing software, had debuted in this operating system, being available to "all Macs since 2012".

Version 10.12: "Sierra"
macOS Sierra was announced on June 13, 2016, during the WWDC16 keynote speech. The update brought the Siri assistant to macOS, featuring several Mac-specific features, like searching for files. It also allowed websites to support Apple Pay as a method of transferring payment, using either a nearby iOS device or Touch ID to authenticate. iCloud also received several improvements, such as the ability to store a user's Desktop and Documents folders on iCloud so they could be synced with other Macs on the same Apple ID. It was released publicly on September 20, 2016.

Version 10.13: "High Sierra"
macOS High Sierra was announced on June 5, 2017, during the WWDC17 keynote speech. It was released on September 25, 2017. The release includes many under-the-hood improvements, including a switch to Apple File System (APFS), the introduction of Metal 2, support for HEVC video, and improvements to VR support. In addition, numerous changes were made to standard applications including Photos, Safari, Notes, and Spotlight.

Version 10.14: "Mojave"
macOS Mojave was announced on June 4, 2018, during the WWDC18 keynote speech. It was released on September 24, 2018. Some of the key new features were Dark wallpaper in dark mode, Desktop stacks and Dynamic Desktop, which changes the desktop background image to correspond to the user's current time of day.

Version 10.15: "Catalina"
macOS Catalina was announced on June 3, 2019, during the WWDC19 keynote speech. It was released on October 7, 2019. It primarily focuses on updates to built-in apps, such as replacing iTunes with separate Music, Podcasts, and TV apps, redesigned Reminders and Books apps, and a new Find My app. It also features Sidecar, which allows the user to use an iPad as a second screen for their computer, or even simulate a graphics tablet with an Apple Pencil. It is the first version of macOS not to support 32-bit applications. The Dashboard application was also removed in the update. Since macOS Catalina, iOS apps can run on macOS with Project Catalyst but requires the app to be made compatible unlike ARM-powered Apple silicon Macs that can run all iOS apps by default.

Version 11: "Big Sur"
macOS Big Sur was announced on June 22, 2020, during the WWDC20 keynote speech. It was released November 12, 2020. The major version number is changed, for the first time since "Mac OS X" was released, making it macOS 11. It brings ARM support, new icons, GUI changes to the system, and other bug fixes.
Since macOS 11.2.3, it is no longer possible to install iOS apps by default from an IPA file instead of the Mac App Store on Apple silicon Macs, which now requires a third-party software to unlock the functionality.

Version 12: "Monterey"
macOS Monterey was announced on June 7, 2021, during the WWDC21 keynote speech. It was released on October 25, 2021. macOS Monterey introduces new features such as Portrait mode in FaceTime, Universal Control, AirPlay to Mac, Shortcuts application, and more. Universal Control allows users to use a single keyboard and mouse to move between devices. AirPlay now allows users to present and share almost anything. The Shortcuts app was also introduced to macOS, giving users access to galleries of pre-built shortcuts, designed for Macs, a service brought from iOS. Users can now also set up shortcuts, among other things.

Version 13: "Ventura" 
macOS Ventura was announced on June 6, 2022, during the WWDC22 keynote speech. It was released on October 24, 2022. macOS Ventura introduces Stage Manager, a new and optional window manager, Continuity Camera, which is a program that allows Mac users to use their iPhone as a camera, and several other new features.

Timeline of Macintosh operating systems

Timeline of macOS versions

See also
 Mac operating systems
 Architecture of macOS
 List of macOS built-in apps
 iOS version history

References

External links
 

MacOS
Lists of operating systems
History
Software version histories